Jens Kestner (born 25 December 1971) is a German politician for the Alternative for Germany (AfD) and since 2017 member of the Bundestag.

Life and politics
Kestner was born 1971 in the West German town of Northeim and became a funeral director.
In 2014 Kestner entered the newly founded populist AfD and became after the 2017 German federal election member of the Bundestag.
Since 2020 Kestner is chairman of the federal state party organisation of the AfD in Lower Saxony.

References

1971 births
People from Northeim
Members of the Bundestag for Lower Saxony
Living people
Members of the Bundestag 2017–2021
Members of the Bundestag for the Alternative for Germany